Felipe Nery Franco (born 26 May 1959) is a Paraguayan former footballer who played as a striker.

During his career, Franco played for teams such as Olimpia Asunción, Club Libertad and Deportivo Humaitá of Paraguay; and for Cúcuta Deportivo and Unión Magdalena of Colombia. While in Olimpia, he won important titles with the club, although he came in as a substitute most of the time. Franco's biggest achievement as a striker came in 1992, when he was the topscorer in the Paraguayan 1st division with 13 goals.

References

External links
 Felipe Nery Franco at BDFutbol
 

Living people
1959 births
Paraguayan footballers
Paraguay international footballers
Paraguayan expatriate footballers
Paraguayan Primera División players
La Liga players
Segunda División players
Segunda División B players
Categoría Primera A players
Club Olimpia footballers
Club Libertad footballers
Cerro Porteño players
Unión Magdalena footballers
Cúcuta Deportivo footballers
Elche CF players
Cartagena FC players
UD Salamanca players
Paraguayan expatriate sportspeople in Colombia
Expatriate footballers in Spain
Expatriate footballers in Colombia
Expatriate footballers in Ecuador
Association football forwards
Paraguayan expatriate sportspeople in Spain